Comedy Central Family was a television channel broadcasting comedy TV series. It launched in the Netherlands as a joint venture between Viacom International Media Networks and Endemol. It featured both foreign acquisitions and Dutch series from the Endemol libraries.

Its launch was originally scheduled for 1 September 2008. It was, however, delayed and the channel eventually launched through cable operator Ziggo on 1 October 2008. On the channel, the Dutch, American, British and Flemish comedy series are aired. Comedy Central Family was available via cable company Ziggo, KPN, Delta and Caiway.

Comedy Central Family closed in the Netherlands on 31 May 2018. However, some of its programmes did move to Comedy Central Extra.

See also
 Comedy Central
 Comedy Central Extra

References

Comedy Central
Television channels and stations established in 2008
Television channels and stations disestablished in 2018
Defunct television channels in the Netherlands
2008 establishments in the Netherlands
2018 disestablishments in the Netherlands